Any God Will Do is the sixth book by the American satirist and political novelist Richard Condon, first published by Random House in 1966.  After the almost unmitigated grimness of his previous book, An Infinity of Mirrors, it was a return to his more usual light-heartedness as displayed in works such A Talent for Loving. Although its theme is madness, unusually for Condon it has little of the almost gratuitous scenes of violence and sudden deaths that punctuate most of his books. The only notable instance is that of a haughty French sommelier who shoots himself at an aristocratic dinner party when he discovers that an American guest is indeed correct in asserting a great white Burgundy can accompany young spring lamb.

The story, which takes place from 1918 to 1922 in New York City, Switzerland, and London, is simple and straightforward by Condon's standards.  Francis Vollmer, an orphan of unknown parentage, is raised by a wealthy New York banker and develops an overwhelming obsession with the notion that he is the offspring of noble parentage, possibly even an illicit union of Kaiser Wilhelm and Queen Mary.  Flitting in and out of overt madness, he spends the course of the book trying to determine his parentage.  Except for The Manchurian Candidate, all of Condon's previous books had displayed a robust interest in food, menus, and gourmandizing; here that interest is carried to its highest level yet: Vollmer teaches himself to become a French chef of a professional level, and much of the book is concerned with the delights of the table.

Critical reception

Time magazine was distinctly lukewarm about the book:
While there is meticulous method in [the protagonist's] madness, there is not nearly enough madness in the narrative methods of Richard Condon (The Manchurian Candidate). What the author intends is a black comedy on the peril of an obsessive delusion; what he achieves is a hybrid between bedroom-comedy pink and olive-drab boredom.... 

Despite clever barbs and lucent epigrams ("Respect is the only successful aphrodisiac"), Any God Will Do is not as acidly funny as it keeps promising to be. In the past, Condon cultists have been treated to comic narrative leaps performed with the agility of a Macedonian goat, and to sly surrealistic glimpses into the lives of Oedipal wrecks and decent drudges who turn up naked at the Last Judgment. But in this book much of the elan is gone; it sometimes appears as if Condon is padding to keep from plotting. Besides, he seems to hold his nose in the presence of his desperate snob, and an author's distaste for his own hero can taint a reader's pleasure. 

Kurt Vonnegut, who in 1966 had not yet reached international acclaim and was far less known than Condon, was more favorably disposed about it in the New York Times:

The sixth novel by Richard Condon, an American, of course, seems very middle-European to me.  I hear echoes of Friedrich Durrenmatt, Max Frisch, und so weiter-- and the theme, I take it, is the loss of identity by modern man. I might as well add the name of Thomas Mann, since a lot of the action takes place in a Swiss sanitarium, and since this is such a serious book (or have I been had again?)  It is serious despite a plot rigged along the lines of low comedy.  What could be more middle-European than that?

The best parts of the book are its celebrations of food....The poorest parts of the book are its characters. The leading man, as has been said, is hollow and is supposed to be hollow, and the supported players who put junk into him or take it out are cartoons....The book is an honorable failure-- a failure because it is boring, despite many game and clever efforts of the author's part to bring it to life. It is honorable because it has tried to say some big things without a trace of meretriciousness.  Condon has not solved a technical problem which may well be insoluble: how to write interestingly about a man who is truly empty. 

Eight years later Christopher Lehmann-Haupt, the regular book reviewer of the Times, began a long review of Condon's latest novel with a backward look at Any God Will Do:

I gave up bothering with Richard Condon's books about five novels ago when in Any God Will Do he led me all the way through his snobbish hero's search for royal forebears, only to reveal at the end that said hero was actually the offspring of dwarfs.  It seemed to me that Mr. Condon was making his point through overkill, just as he had one in his previous novel, An Infinity of Mirrors, a one-dimensional attempt to exploit our revulsion with Nazism. The verve and cleverness that produced The Manchurian Candidate seemed drained.

Lehmann-Haupt went on to give a favorable review to Winter Kills.

Title

The title, as is the case in six of Condon's first seven books, is derived from the last line of a typical bit of Condonian doggerel that supposedly comes from a fictitious Keener's Manual mentioned in many of his earlier novels:

Interest is the key to life,
Interest in the clue,
Interest is the drum and fife
And any god will do.

The verse is found in only one place, as an epigraph on a blank page four pages after the title page and two pages before the beginning of the text.  Unlike some of Condon's other books, however, in which the verse is clearly relevant to the theme of the book, this particular title, Any God Will Do, has no apparent relevance to what happens in the course of the novel.

Theme

The theme of the book is stated succinctly by the unfortunate female lover of Francis Vollmer: "He went mad because of snobbism."

"He had been a poor orphan boy. Without knowing it, he revealed that every time he told me that he had been a rich orphan boy. He has convinced himself that he is really the son a great and noble family. First he had to prove to himself that he was a better man than he thought he was; then he had to prove to everyone else that he was better than them because of the accident of his exalted birth. But he had invented all of it, it never had happened, and he drove himself quite mad."

Typical Condon quirks and characteristics

The novel offers several fine examples of the traits and stylistic tricks that are typical of Condon's work, among them, as the playwright George Axelrod once put it, "the madness of his similies, the lunacy of his metaphors". In a book in which the principal theme is social climbing, and the setting is Switzerland, we have:

She...took Francis in her arms, and began to ascend the north face of one of the highest orgasms she had ever climbed. On reaching the summit, she greatly cheered a young watercolorist painting in the garrett directly above them by celebrating the victorious ascent with outcries as exultant as those of a Cunard liner.

References

1966 American novels
Novels by Richard Condon